Little Soya is the gluten free soy sauce brand owned by Little Products Co., LLC, based in Houston, Texas. It was founded by Gary T. Murphy in 2008 when the Caesars Palace Hotel & Casino in Las Vegas, Nevadam requested his company find a premium soy sauce in a fish-shaped container for its new buffet and room service guests.

Little Soya is tested at less than 5 ppm gluten, below the U.S. Food and Drug Administration (FDA) standard of twenty ppm, and is labeled non-GMO.

The packaging is fish shaped, refillable, and 100% recyclable and in 2012 earned Little Soya recognition as a sofi Silver Finalist for Outstanding Innovation in Packaging Design or Function. The sofi is an annual award given by the Specialty Food Association. and considered the most coveted award in the specialty foods industry.

Since its introduction in 2008, Little Soya has seen tremendous growth and gained worldwide recognition. In 2012, the company secured a deal with Norway's Harlem Foods for an initial order of 1.3 million units and another order for 1.9 million units. Other possible international accounts include distribution deals in Australia, South America, and Germany.

Domestically, in 2012, Little Soya signed a deal with United Natural Foods, based out of Providence, Rhode Island. United Natural Foods is one of the nation's largest food distributors.

In 2013 Little Soya began to pivot to handle more and more food service orders for chefs and restaurants around the United States by offering their new 5 gallon and half gallon containers used for cooking in the back of the house. This came as a result of chefs tasting Little Soya in Las Vegas and at various grocery stores and quickly deciding that Little Soya is truly better tasting than the other brands. Little Soya is now used at the following restaurants around the US, Uchi & Uchiko Restaurants in Houston and Austin, along with Barnaby's, Underbelly, Benjy's and Snap Kitchen in the Houston market; TAO, Nobu, Sweet Chick, and Contra NYC in the NY market. In Los Angeles market, Little Soya can be found at the Hilton Universal, Gingergrass and Bourbon Street Bar & Grill. Additionally, Kunfusion & Innovative Dining Group have started using Little Soya.

Little Soya soy sauce can also be found in grocery retail outlets throughout the United States. This includes over 500 Safeway locations, and numerous restaurants all over the country. Other retail outlets include Cost Plus World Market, Safeway Inc., Vons, King Kullen, Stop & Shop, Big Y, Phoenicia, and Spec's Wine, Spirits & Finer Foods, among others.

It also has a big presence in Las Vegas, being used at the MGM Grand, Palms Casino Resort, Luxor, Station Casinos, TAO Beach and Marquee.

On July 24, 2014, Little Soya soy sauce will be launching to the International Space Station to be used by astronauts from all over the world. Little Soya will be launched on board the Ariane 5, ATV-5, or Automated Transfer Vehicle 005 (ATV 005), named the Georges Lemaître ATV. This is an unmanned cargo rocket sending supplies to the ISS. Little Soya's CEO Gary T. Murphy received a call about 2 years ago from Vickie Kloeris, manager of the NASA Space Food Systems Laboratory. Vickie told Gary that one of the US astronauts had complained during his last debriefing (after coming down from a mission on the ISS), that whenever he opened a soy sauce packet in space, it would spew all over. Vickie's department had been tasked with finding a solution to NASA's soy sauce problem and thus found Little Soya.

On March 31, 2016, the president and CEO of Little Soya, Gary T. Murphy, announced the unexpected closure of the company via their official website.

References

External links
Little Soya Official Site
The Oregonian, "Pack Your Own Gluten-Free Soy Sauce"
My San Antonio, "Eye on the Aisles: Little Soya"

Soy product brands